The 1981 ABN World Tennis Tournament was a tennis tournament played on indoor carpet courts at Rotterdam Ahoy in the Netherlands. It was a WCT tournament that was part of the 1981 Volvo Grand Prix circuit. It was the ninth edition of the tournament and was held from 16 March through 22 March 1981. First-seeded Jimmy Connors won the singles title, his second after 1978.

Finals

Singles

 Jimmy Connors defeated  Gene Mayer 6–1, 2–6, 6–2

Doubles
 Fritz Buehning /  Ferdi Taygan defeated  Gene Mayer /  Sandy Mayer 7–6, 1–6, 6–4

References

External links
 Official website 
 Official website 
 ATP tournament profile
 ITF tournament details

 
ABN World Tennis Tournament
1981 in Dutch tennis
March 1981 sports events in Europe